Haft Jubeh (also Romanized as Haft Jūbeh, Haft Chūbah, and Haft Chūbeh) is a village in Behnamarab-e Jonubi Rural District, Javadabad District, Varamin County, Tehran Province, Iran. At the 2006 census, its population was 335, in 79 families.

References 

Populated places in Varamin County